is a manga written and illustrated by Hidenori Hara.

Live Action film

It was adapted into a live-action film in 2011.

References

External links
Official website for the film 

2006 manga
Manga adapted into films
Shogakukan manga
Seinen manga